Provincial historic sites of Alberta are museums and historic sites run by the Government of Alberta.

Only sites owned by the provincial government and run as a functioning historic site or museum are known as Provincial Historic Sites.  Buildings and sites owned by private citizens and companies or other levels or branches of government may gain one of two levels of historic designation, "Registered Historic Resource" or "Provincial Historic Resource".  A concentration of several heritage buildings can be designated a "Provincial Historic Area", and there are two such areas in Alberta: downtown Fort Macleod and Edmonton's Old Strathcona.  Historic designation in Alberta is governed by the Historic Resources Act.  The province also lists buildings deemed historically significant by municipal governments on the Alberta Register of Historic Places, which is also part of the larger Canadian Register of Historic Places although this does not imply provincial or federal government status or protection.  The Alberta Main Street Program helps to preserve historic buildings in the downtowns of smaller communities.  The Heritage Survey Program is a survey of 80,000 historic buildings in Alberta, with no protective status.

List of provincial historic sites of Alberta
The official list as per the government of Alberta is:

 Brooks Aqueduct, irrigation museum near Brooks
Carbondale Railway Station, Carbondale, AB 1913-1959 (https://www.stalberttoday.ca/local-news/carbondale-resident-uncovers-historic-tragedy-in-backyard-1852026)
 Carmangay Tipi Rings - archaeological tipi ring site at Carmangay, near Calgary
 Father Lacombe Chapel / Chapelle du Père Lacombe - missionary church built by Father Albert Lacombe in 1861 in St. Albert
 Frank Slide Interpretive Centre - site of rock slide tragedy in 1903, in Frank
 Fort George and Buckingham House - fur trade post, near Elk Point
 Head-Smashed-In Buffalo Jump - (also UNESCO World Heritage Site and National Historic Site of Canada) - First Nations' history, near Fort Macleod
 Historic Dunvegan - fur trade post and mission, near Fairview
 Leitch Collieries - coal mine near Passburg in the Municipality of Crowsnest Pass
 Lougheed House - sandstone mansion from 1891 in Calgary.
 Oil Sands Discovery Centre - oil sands mining display, Fort McMurray
 Okotoks Erratic - giant rock left by glaciers, Okotoks
 Remington Carriage Museum - collection of horse-drawn forms of transportation, Cardston
 Reynolds-Alberta Museum - machinery and transportation, aviation hall of fame, Wetaskiwin
 Royal Alberta Museum - official provincial museum (formerly Provincial Museum of Alberta), Edmonton
 Royal Tyrrell Museum - dinosaurs and palaeontology, near Drumheller
 Rutherford House - home of Alberta's first premier, University of Alberta, Edmonton
 Stephansson House - home of famous Icelandic poet Stephan G. Stephansson, near Red Deer
 Turner Valley Gas Plant - site of early oil discovery, near Calgary
 Tyrrell Field Station - field station of Tyrrell Museum, near Brooks
 Ukrainian Cultural Heritage Village - recreation of early Ukrainian settlement in Canada, near Edmonton
 Victoria Settlement - early pioneer settlement, near Smoky Lake

See also
 List of National Historic Sites of Canada in Alberta
 List of historic places in Alberta

References

External links
For a partial list of privately owned buildings or other sites that are designated as "Provincial Historic Resources" see:
Alberta Tourism, Parks, Recreation and Culture - List of Historic Resources Designated in 2001
List of Historic Resources Designated in 2002

 
History of Alberta by location
Culture of Alberta
Alberta
 Provincial historic sites of Alberta